Minneriya Railway Station (Sinhala: මින්නේරිය දුම්රිය නැවතුම්පොළ)  is a railway station in the North Central Province of Sri Lanka.

The station is located on the Batticaloa line and is owned by Sri Lanka Railways.

Continuity

References 

Railway stations in North Central Province, Sri Lanka
Railway stations on the Batticaloa Line